Dimitris Karamanolis (alternate spelling: Dimitrios) (Greek: Δημήτρης Καραμανώλης; born August 23, 1998) is a Greek professional basketball player who last played for PAOK of the Greek Basket League. He is a 1.98 m (6'6") tall shooting guard-small forward.

Professional career
After playing with the junior youth clubs of PAOK Thessaloniki for 5 years, Karamanolis started his pro career with the senior men's team of PAOK, in the summer of 2016, after he signed a 4-year contract with the club. On September 12, 2018, Karamanolis was loaned to Kastoria for the 2018–19 season.

Personal
Karamanolis' father, Apostolos Karamanolis, is a basketball coach, and he played professional basketball with the Greek Basket League club Panionios, in the 1980s. Moreover, his uncle, Theodoros Karamanolis, played in 141 games in the Greek League, with Panionios and Dafni.

References

External links
FIBA Champions League Profile
Eurobasket.com Profile
Greek Basket League Profile 
Greek Basket League Profile 
PAOK Profile

1998 births
Living people
Greek men's basketball players
P.A.O.K. BC players
Shooting guards
Small forwards
Basketball players from Volos